Chris Humphries FLS (Derby, 29 April 1947 – 31 July 2009) was a British botanist known for his work on systematic botany and biogeography.

In 1980, he was awarded the Bicentenary Medal of the Linnean Society. In 2001 the Linnean Society of London awarded him the Linnean Medal for his contributions to the botany.

References

1947 births
2009 deaths
British botanists
Fellows of the Linnean Society of London
20th-century English scientists